Lu Yongfu (born December 1922) is a Chinese translator and Director of the Chinese Translation Association.

Lu was one of the main translators of the works of Russian novelist Aleksandr Pushkin into Chinese. For his contributions to the introduction of Russian literature to foreign readers, he was honored with a Pushkin Medal by the Government of the Russian Federation in 1999.

Biography
Lu was born in Xi'an, Shaanxi in December 1922.

He graduated from Northwest University in 1946, where he majored in Russian language.
After graduation, he taught in Shaanxi.

After the founding of the Communist State, Lu worked as an officer in the General Officer of the Central Military Commission, then he was transferred to the People's Literature Publishing House.

Lu joined the China Writers Association in 1979.

Translation
 The Complete Works of Pushkin
 Collected Works of Mayakovsky (Vladimir Mayakovsky)
 Rylee and Majienong (Jamalddin Ilyas Nezami)
 Earth-god (Kahlil Gibran)
 The man, Jesus (Kahli Gibran)

Award
 In 1999, he was awarded a Pushkin Medal for his translations by the Government of the Russian Federation.
 Chinese Translation Association - Competent Translator (2004)

References

1922 births
Writers from Xi'an
People's Republic of China translators
Russian–Chinese translators
Living people
20th-century Chinese translators
21st-century Chinese translators